York Township is one of fourteen townships in Dearborn County, Indiana. As of the 2010 census, its population was 1,221 and it contained 471 housing units.

History
York Township was founded in 1841. A majority of the early settlers being natives of New York caused the name to be selected.

Geography

Unincorporated towns
 Guilford
 Yorkville

Major highways
  Indiana State Road 1

Cemeteries
The township contains one cemetery, West Fork.

References
 United States Census Bureau cartographic boundary files
 U.S. Board on Geographic Names

External links

 Indiana Township Association
 United Township Association of Indiana

Townships in Dearborn County, Indiana
Townships in Indiana
1841 establishments in Indiana
Populated places established in 1841